Hamzeh Shakib is an Iranian civil engineer and conservative politician. He was a Tehran councillor from 2003 to 2013 and is a professor at Tarbiat Modares University.

References

 Councillor profile
 Academic webpage

1961 births
Living people
Tehran Councillors 2003–2007
Tehran Councillors 2007–2013
Coalition of the Pleasant Scent of Servitude politicians
Alliance of Builders of Islamic Iran politicians
Bangalore University alumni
IIT Delhi alumni